Mount Ruskin is a  mountain summit located in Kings Canyon National Park, in Fresno County of northern California, United States.

History
The class 3 west slope was first climbed August 13, 1945, by Art Reyman.

Mount Ruskin was named in 1895 by Professor Bolton Brown for John Ruskin (1819–1900), English writer and critic. This mountain's name has been officially adopted by the United States Board on Geographic Names.

Climate
According to the Köppen climate classification system, Mount Ruskin is located in an alpine climate zone. Most weather fronts originate in the Pacific Ocean, and travel east toward the Sierra Nevada mountains. As fronts approach, they are forced upward by the peaks, causing them to drop their moisture in the form of rain or snowfall onto the range (orographic lift). Precipitation runoff from this mountain drains into tributaries of the Kings River.

See also
 
 List of mountain peaks of California

References

External links
 Weather forecast: Mount Ruskin

Mountains of Fresno County, California
Mountains of Kings Canyon National Park
North American 3000 m summits
Mountains of Northern California
Sierra Nevada (United States)